Adhur  is a village in Kasaragod district in the state of Kerala, India.

Demographics
As of 2011 Census, Adhur had a population of 11,598 with 5,842 males and 5,756 females. In Adhur, 12% of the population was under 6 years of age. Adhur had an average literacy of 88.6% lower than the state average of 94%: male literacy was 93.3% and female literacy was 84%.

Transportation
The western main road to Kasaragod has access to NH 66 which connects to Mangalore in the north and Calicut in the south. SH 55 passes through Adhur town which connects Cherkala near Kasaragod  and Jalsoor in Karnataka state. This road is getting renovated under Rebuild Kerala scheme with German financial assistance. The road to the east connects to Sullia in Karnataka from where Mysore and Bangalore can be accessed.  The nearest major railway station is Kasaragod railway station on Shoranur-Mangalore Section. The nearest international airport  is at Mangalore.

See also

 Muliyar
 Karadka
 Delampady

References

Cherkala - Jalsoor Rd